Mayumi Pejo is a former US Olympian in taekwondo from Binghamton NY.  She achieved a bronze medal, as a 16-year-old, during the 1988 Seoul Olympics.

References

American female taekwondo practitioners
Olympic taekwondo practitioners of the United States
Taekwondo practitioners at the 1988 Summer Olympics
Living people
Year of birth missing (living people)
World Taekwondo Championships medalists
20th-century American women